The 1914 University of New Mexico football team was an American football team that represented the University of New Mexico as an independent during the 1914 college football season. In its fourth season under head coach Ralph Hutchinson (who was also the university's first athletic director), the team compiled a 3–1–1 record and outscored opponents by a total of 77 to 33. Halfback Fred "Fritz" Calkins was the team captain.

The team secured four spots on the 1914 All-New Mexico football team selected by the Albuquerque Morning Journal with input from the coaches of the University of New Mexico, New Mexico A&M and the New Mexico Military Institute. The honorees were "Swifty" Shields at right end; Chet Lee at right guard; Greenfield at left guard; and "Fritz" Calkins at left halfback. Calkins was also named captain of the all-state team.

Schedule

References

University of New Mexico
New Mexico Lobos football seasons
University of New Mexico football